The emerald toucanet (Aulacorhynchus prasinus) is a species of near-passerine bird in the toucan family Ramphastidae. It is found from Mexico to Nicaragua.

Taxonomy and systematics

The emerald toucanet was originally described in the genus Pteroglossus. For many years it was treated as having at least 14 subspecies. In 2008 the International Ornithological Committee (IOC) split 10 of those subspecies to create seven new species and retained four of them as subspecies of their current emerald toucanet sensu stricto. BirdLife International's Handbook of the Birds of the World (HBW) concurred. Some of the seven have since been merged resulting in the current (2022) Wagler's toucanet (A. wagleri), blue-throated toucanet (A. caeruleogularis), white-throated toucanet (A. albivitta), and black-throated toucanet ( atrogularis) in addition to the emerald toucanet. 

However, the North and South American Classification Committees of the American Ornithological Society and the Clements taxonomy declined to follow them. In 2017 they did split the emerald toucanet into two species, the northern (A. prasinus) and southern (A. albivitta) emerald-toucanets, each with seven subspecies. They treat the IOC's "emerald toucanet" as four subspecies of the northern emerald-toucanet.

Four subspecies of emerald toucanet are recognized by the IOC and HBW:

 A. p. warneri - Winker, 2000
 The nominate A. p. prasinus - (Gould, 1833)
 A. p. virescens - Ridgway, 1912
 A. p. volcanius - Dickey & van Rossem, 1930

Description

Like other toucans, the emerald toucanet is brightly marked and has a large bill. The sexes are alike in appearance although the female generally is smaller and shorter-billed. Their bill has a black mandible, a yellow maxilla with a black patch near the nares, and a white vertical strip at its base. All subspecies have plumage that is mainly green like that of other members of genus Aulacorhynchus, and is somewhat lighter below than above. The nominate's crown has a bronze tinge and its nape and upper back a yellowy bronze tint. Their eye is dark brown surrounded by even darker bare skin. Their lower face and throat are white. Their flanks are bright yellow-green to green-yellow and their undertail coverts and the underside of the tail are chestnut. The base of their tail's upper surface is green becoming blue towards the end and the tips of the feathers are chestnut. Subspecies A. p. warneri has a yellowish wash on its throat and some yellow on the face. A. p. virescens is slightly smaller than the nominate. It has a yellower face and throat, more yellow on the flanks, and darker chestnut tips on the tail feathers. A. p. volcanius is similar to the nominate but paler overall and slightly smaller. Immatures are grayer than adults and the chestnut of the tail tips is browner and smaller.

Distribution and habitat

The subspecies of emerald toucanet are found thus:

 A. p. warneri, Sierra de Los Tuxtlas in southeastern Mexico's Veracruz state
 A. p. prasinus, eastern and southeastern Mexico including the Yucatán Peninsula, Belize, and northern Guatemala
 A. p. virescens, from southeastern Mexico's Chiapas state south through Guatemala, El Salvador, and Honduras into northern Nicaragua
 A. p. volcanius, eastern El Salvador's Volcán San Miguel

The emerald toucanet primarily inhabits humid montane forest but is also found in more open landscapes like secondary forest, shrublands, pastures, and plantations. In elevation it ranges from near sea level to at least .

Behavior

Movement

The emerald toucanet is non-migratory.

Social behavior

The emerald toucanet is gregarious and frequently gathers in groups of up to about 10.

Feeding

The emerald toucanet forages by gleaning, usually while perched. Its diet is eclectic and includes a wide variety of fruits, invertebrates of many orders, and vertebrate prey such as birds, eggs, lizards, and snakes.

Breeding

The emerald toucanet's breeding season is from March to July. It nests in tree cavities, either natural or those abandoned by woodpeckers. The typical clutch size is three or four but can range from one to five. Both sexes incubate the eggs but the female does so more than the male. The incubation period is 16 days and fledging occurs 42 to 45 days after hatch.

Vocal and non-vocal sounds

The emerald toucanet's call is "a nasal, barking Wok!-Wok!-Wok!-Wok!-Wok!-Wok!-Wok!...". It also makes "a growling, throaty wra'a'a'a'a'a'ak".

Status

The IUCN has assessed the emerald toucanet as being of Least Concern. It has a very large range but its population size is not known and is believed to be decreasing. No immeditate threats have been identified. However, it "is vulnerable to habitat destruction".

Relationship to humans

Aviculture

The emerald toucanet is a popular pet toucan. It is affectionate when hand-fed and loves to play and interact with its owner. Emerald toucanets are as quick to learn tricks as cockatoos. They are active and need a large cage for their size, including perches that they can hop back and forth on. They also require a high-fruit diet, without which they are susceptible to a disease of excessive iron storage that is similar to hemochromatosis in humans.

References

External links

Bibliography of online, ornithological articles which explore the natural history of the Emerald toucanet, Aulacorhynchus prasinus prasinus
Stamps (for Belize, El Salvador, Honduras, Mexico and Nicaragua) at bird-stamps.org
 

emerald toucanet
Birds of the Yucatán Peninsula
Birds of Central America
Birds of Belize
Birds of Guatemala
Birds of El Salvador
Birds of Honduras
emerald toucanet